Longyang Road is an interchange station that serves both the Shanghai maglev train and lines 2, 7, 16 and 18 on the Shanghai Metro. It provides quick transfers between the metro system and the Maglev train to and from Pudong International Airport. There are two separate fare-paid zones at this station: one for the conventional metro lines (Lines 2, 7, 16, 18) and one for the Maglev train, which has a separate fare system. It is also the third four-line interchange station in mainland China and the second in Shanghai, after Century Avenue and Chegongmiao in Shenzhen, and the first five-line interchange (Maglev included) station in Shanghai and mainland China.

History 
Trial operations on the Shanghai Maglev opened on the last day of 2002.

The interchanges with Lines 7 opened on 5 December 2009.
The interchange with Line 16 opened on 28 December 2014.
The interchange with Line 18 opened on 30 December 2021, with the formal opening of Line 18 north section, the station becomes a five-line transfer station.

Structure 

Longyang Road station consists of five parts, from north to the south respectively, Line 7, Line 2, Maglev Line, Line 16 and Line 18. Lines 2, 7 and 18 are under ground, while the station hall of Line 2 is on the ground level. The station on Line 16 and Maglev Line are elevated stations.

The platform of Lines 2, 7, 18 are standard island platforms. There are 2 sets of island platforms at Line 16, while trains provide service usually on platforms 1, 2 and 3. The platform 2 is usually used for express trains (stops only at Luoshan Road station, Xinchang station, Huinan station, Lingang Avenue station and Dishui Lake station) and non-stop trains (directly heads for Dishui Lake). The train coupling and decoupling take place on weekdays at platform 1.

Transfer 
Since the opening of the north section of Line 18, Longyang Road has become a five-line transfer station. Between the part of Line 7, Line 2, Line 16 and Line 18, there are two mono-directional transfer passages. For example, passengers at Line 7 can go through a transfer passage and arrive at the station hall of Line 2, which takes about 3 minutes. Then across the station hall of Line 2, passengers walks above one minute to arrive at the west end of Line 16 station hall. Passengers can either turn left to transfer to Line 16, which takes 3.5 minutes, or walk straight to transfer to Line 18, which takes about 1 minute and 45 seconds.

Passengers at the Line 18 station hall at the south end of the whole station can walk to the station hall of Line 16 through a transfer passage at the east, which takes about 3.5 minutes. Then passengers can arrive at the station hall of Line 2 through the station hall of Maglev Line and a set of mono-directional escalator, which takes about 2.5 minutes. Following through the transfer passage, passengers at the Line 2 station hall will walk to the east end of Line 7 station hall, which takes about 2min.

To take the Shanghai maglev train, the nearest exit is Exit 4 at Line 2.

Incidents 
At 11:05 on 26 April 2021, a passenger climbed the passenger edge doors, in an attempt to enter the tunnel of Line 2.

Station staff quickly reacted, however, staff later confirmed the passenger that climbed the door had died.

Services continued from noon that day.

Places nearby 
 Huamu Park
 Longyang Plaza
 Shanghai New International Expo Center
 Wan Bang City Garden

References

External link

Shanghai Metro stations in Pudong
Line 2, Shanghai Metro
Line 7, Shanghai Metro
Line 16, Shanghai Metro
Line 18, Shanghai Metro
Railway stations in China opened in 1999
Railway stations in Shanghai